Edward Maitland (1824–1897) was an English writer and occultist

Edward Maitland may also refer to

 Edward Maitland (RAF officer) (1880–1921), English military aviator
 Edward Maitland, Lord Barcaple (1803–1870), Scottish advocate and judge